Ten Little Mistresses is a 2023 Philippine dark comedy-mystery film produced by TheIdeaFirst Company in association with Quantum Productions released on February 15, 2023, worldwide through Amazon Prime Video. Knowned locally as "Sampung Mga Kerida", it is dubbed as "mistress murder mystery", the first ever Filipino-produced film to launch on Amazon Prime. The film stars Eugene Domingo, John Arcilla with 10 mistresses portrayed by Pokwang, Carmi Martin, Agot Isidro, Kris Bernal, Arci Muñoz, Christian Bables, Sharlene San Pedro, Iana Bernardez, Kate Alejandrino, and Adrianna So — each giving unique characterizations that are humorous in their own right. The title of the film is a playful reference to the American nursery rhyme, Ten Little Indians and Filipino's "Sampung mga Daliri".The film debut at #1 in the Amazon Top Prime Videos in the Philippines.

Background
According to the cast members, the film will highlight women's worth and self-respect which are timely reminders to everyone on Valentine's Day, a day prior to its release to over 240 territories on February 15, 2023. Eugene Domingo who plays the lead role credited Director and producer Jun Lana for what she referenced as another masterpiece that boasts the beauty of women. She added: “The point is, we are very beautiful. We are the most beautiful God has created[...]Do not settle for anyone who is less than what you deserve”. She went on to remind everyone that being beautiful is not connected to being in a relationship. Lana also uttered in an interview that he hopes his new film becomes the “biggest, wildest, campiest mistress movie to end all mistress movies.” The special screening for the film attended by the cast was held at Red Carpet Cinemas in Shangri La Mall on February 7, 2023. A press conference followed wherein Lana revealed that the film was planned in early 2021 but due to lack of resources, the film was set aside. Producer of the film, Perci Intalan approached Prime Video in California and said, ...“When we pitched this to Prime Video in L.A. (California), we realized how massive the global audience could be for our film. But it’s still surreal now, knowing that we’ll be in 240 countries and territories. We’re just grateful that we give justice to the hard work of every world-class Filipino artist involved in the film.” With the Amazon Prime coming into rescue, the film finally went into production. The first teaser was released on January 13, 2023, by Amazon Prime.

Costume design
Jaylo Conanan headed the costume design while Jaydee Jasa was incharge for the wigs for the film wherein it drew inspiration from the theme "extravaganza" and "drag". Loud embellished gowns and big headdresses are worn by the different so-called mistresses in the video. The characters and their looks are described by the producers as "campy", "colorful",  styles that Filipinos absolutely adore and appreciate.

Filming
The film began principal photography in late 2022 and began filming early 2023 with various locations in Alitagtag, Batangas, Philippines and in Club Morocco Beach Resort & Country Club in Subic, Zambales, Philippines.

Soundtrack
The film has one original song performed on the opening scene of the movie titled as "Sampung mga Kerida". The main soundtrack for the film is Maymay Entrata's "Amakabogera", released in 2021.

Plot
Follows the story of a widowed billionaire, Valentin Esposo, and his ten mistresses, fighting tooth and nail to become his new legal wife. On the eve of his 60th birthday, newly widowed billionaire Valentin Esposo gathers his ten mistresses to make amends for the way he has treated them. In the past, Valentin was always on the lookout for the next pretty young thing. But now, he claims that the death of his wife has made him re-assess the way he was living his life. Now, he wants to start anew. All 10 women end up being suspects when Valentin unexpectedly drops dead during a gathering.

Cast and characters

Eugene Domingo as Lilith:Blue-eyed head maid of Valentin Esposo. She became Valentin's fiancé after Charo's death. According to a review of Rafael Bautista from Nylon Manila, the film is one of the many reasons why Domingo is considered a comedy queen and the role suits her perfectly as the film opened to Domingo's blue eyes. He also added that no matter what role she takes on, Domingo will always serve, and this movie is no exception.During the film press conference, Domingo stated "...I’d like to focus on how direk Jun doesn’t fail to write a script that gives women power and a good image[...]It’s just always about how beautiful women are..."
John Arcilla as Valentin:The billionaire who invited his ten mistresses to his palace for his 60th birthday, to end things with them and to announce his marriage to Lilith. Director Jun Lana exclaimed that Arcilla had fun with the role and went full-on suave the whole time.
Pokwang as Babet:Valentin's second mistress after Magenta. She portrays the only mistress who bears a child with Valentin.
Carmi Martin as Magenta:Valentin's first mistress, who has insecurities against Babet portrayed by Pokwang, the mistress after her. On an interview, Martin described the film as a wake up call to women who does not know their worth or feels worthless in a relationship.
Agot Isidro as Helga:Helga is the only professional out of Valentin's mistresses. She is a known Dermatologist which Valentin regularly visit for his skin care. Helga fell in love with Valentin's wit and caring attitude, and his wealth. When Isidro was asked regarding the lesson from the film on an interview with The Philippines Star, she advised to know your worth as woman and to have self-respect.
Kris Bernal as Diva:Bernal portrays to what the film makers described as blonde dumb diva, former assistant of Dermatologist Helga portrayed by Isidro.On an Instagram post, Bernal stated that after filming her scenes, she learned that girls has to know their worth as a woman.
Arci Muñoz as Aura:Aura is a faith healer who can see selective future. She predicted that a terrible event will happen on Valentin's birthday but unable to foresee who murdered Valentin. 
Christian Bables as Lady G.:Lady G is not an official mistress, since he confessed that he is actually the brother of the original Lady G. who died of depression because of Valentin. He wanted to revenge his sister making him the initial primary suspect for the killing of Valentin. 
Sharlene San Pedro as Moon Young:The youngest among the mistresses. She is a korean-loving teenage girl who uses her love of Korean culture to help her forget about her problems. 
Iana Bernardez as Coco:Coco is considered the 10th mistress and did not share a lot of memories with Valentin. She attended the event to see how men can be patriarchal and abusive at the same time. 
Kate Alejandrino as Sparkle:Sparkle is a beauty pageant title holder who cannot live up with her "woman empowerment" advocacy. 
Adrianna So as Because:Because is a social media influencer who is known for various memes in the internet. She was named Because because of her repeated "because?" remarks during conversation.
Donna Cariaga as Chicklet:Lilith's second-in-command maid. Cariaga was praised by various media outlet for her performance in the film. Nylon Magazine Manila stated that "...the way she delivers the most random statements at the most unlikely of times, with no inflection in her voice whatsoever, deserves an ovation of its own"
Cherry Pie Picache as Charo:Charo is Valentin's legal wife who died years earlier.

Reception

Kristofer Purnell of The Philippine Star gave the film a positive remark in his review titled as "Spotlight on Filipino camp, costume design". He noticed the film's similarity to  classic Agatha Christie novels or to the "Knives Out" films by Rian Johnson but what makes it unique is how Lana incorporates Filipino pop culture into the film. He also added that the film is so entertaining as it leans into and accepts how campy it is. He further stated that everyone in the cast is acting on a high calibre that doesn't upstage anyone else, with Domingo and Cariaga's acting as the most remarkable. However, he also mentioned that Lana struggled to wrap the theme of women empowerment into a bow by the end. Aldous Vince Cabildo from Tripzilla described the film as hilarious. On his review, he stated that despite the heavy star power this film presents, there are no actual scene-stealers. The mistresses may have conflicts, but their rage against one another and love for Don Valentin pull them in the same direction. Fred Hawson of ABS-CBN News gave the film a mixed review praising the visual spectacle created by the lavish, colorful, and outlandish haute couture of the mistresses designed by costume designer Jaylo Conanan. However, he stated that the director had no time to give each one a good backstory to make them viable as suspects as he wasted some screen time with non-sense catty arguments of the mistresses. He also wished that the actual execution of the crime could have been developed more carefully and logically.In a review from Preview, Em Enriquez described the film as an "in-your-face" type of comedy. If you didn't get the joke, the scene will replay until it gets even just the slightest chuckle out of you. She further stated that the feminist understones. in the film aren't subtly hidden, because, in fact, they're situated in plain sight. Meanwhile, she also stated that the film presents scenarios that could never possibly occur, like the mastermind behind the murder have actually orchestrated the whole thing. She closed her review by stating "...The movie takes those hints of sarcasm and humor and puts them on steroids. It uses them to propel forward the moral of the story without sacrificing a bloody good time for the viewers. By the time the credits roll, the message is expressed loud and clear..."Le Baltar from Rappler given the film an average review, and stated that the "kabit" (infidelity) genre, replete with iconic lines and confrontation scenes such as those in Chito Roño’s Minsan Lang Kita Iibigin (1994), Ruel Bayani’s No Other Woman (2011), and Rory Quintos and Dado Lumibao’s The Legal Wife (2014), has long maintained a steady presence in Philippine television and cinema. And Lana’s attempts at reinventing the wheel hinges on a more progressive lens: how queridas have always been villainized as if they’re solely to blame in stories of affairs; how men, especially those with charm and good looks, often get a free pass; and how the imbalances of power factor into these dynamics.Philip Cu Unjieng of Manila Bulletin awarded the film a mixed review and praised Eugene Domingo's performance, but also states that "...For if there a criticism to be levelled towards the film, it could be the excess of camp, and how the film feels like the dramatization and extension of a gay bar stand-up act. This may appeal to several in the audience, but for others, it can also get tiring, and one-dimensional..."

References

Amazon Prime Video original programming
Amazon Prime Video original films